Moky Makura is a Nigerian author, journalist, actress, and businesswoman who serves as an executive director of Africa No Filter, an organization aiming at inducing changes in Africa by means of mass media.

Life
Makura was born in Lagos, Nigeria, as a member of the House of Akinsemoyin, a royal family of the Nigerian chieftaincy system. She has a degree in politics, economics, and law from University of Buckingham. In 1998, she moved to South Africa, and in 1999, started her own consultancy company. She was Deputy Director for Communications Africa at the Bill & Melinda Gates Foundation, and since 2017 the representative of the Foundation in South Africa.

In South Africa, she also acted on television, mainly in the Jacob's Cross drama series.

Books
 Africa's Greatest Entrepreneurs, Penguin Random House (2008).

References

Living people
Nigerian journalists
Year of birth missing (living people)